Apple Valley Airport  is a public airport three miles (4.8 km) north of Apple Valley in San Bernardino County, California, United States. The airport has two runways and is used for general aviation. It opened around 1970.

Past airline service
The first airline flights to Apple Valley were to the old airport  by Air West predecessor Bonanza Air Lines from the late 1950s until 1966: DC-3s, then Fairchild F-27s.

From 1970 to 1973 Apple Valley was served by Hughes Airwest (formerly called Air West) F-27s to Las Vegas, Riverside, Ontario, and Los Angeles (LAX). In 1979 commuter airline Inland Empire Airlines scheduled Swearingen Metros to Ontario, Los Angeles, Bullhead City, and Las Vegas.

Facilities

The airport has two runways:
 18/36: 6,498 x 150 ft (1,981 x 46 m), asphalt
 8/26: 4,099 x 60 ft (1,249 x 18 m), asphalt

References

External links

 

Airports in San Bernardino County, California
Mojave Desert